John Skip, Skipp, Skippe, or Skypp may refer to:

 John Skypp (–1552), English cleric and Bishop of Hereford
 John Skippe (1741–1812), English amateur artist
 John Skipp (born 1957), American horror and fantasy author